"The Writing on the Wall" is a 1961 song which was a Top 5 Billboard Hot 100 single for Adam Wade. The song was co-written by Mark Barkan, Sandy Baron and George Paxton. Wade's B-side "Point Of No Return" also charted as #85 in Billboard.

Covers
Adam Wade - The Writing On The Wall /  "Point Of No Return" - Coed - USA - CO 550 
Tommy Steele - The Writing On The Wall / Drunken Guitar - Decca - UK - F 11372
Dale Harris - The Writing On The Wall / Night Life - Meremac - USA - 101  1966
Gerd Böttcher, Decca, Germany, 7", Cat# D 19 229, 1961, Track A: Man geht so leicht am Glück vorbei (The Writing On The Wall)

References

1961 songs
Songs written by Mark Barkan
Adam Wade (singer) songs